SPV can refer to the following:
Sardar Patel Vidyalaya, a school in Delhi, India
Service for Poland's Victory, a Polish WWII resistance organization
Budd SPV-2000 rail car
Orange SPV, 2002 smartphone
Irish Section 110 Special Purpose Vehicle (SPV),  type of company
Special purpose vehicle or special-purpose entity
Spectrum Pursuit Vehicle, a fictional vehicle
SPV GmbH, a German record label
Surface photovoltage, of a semiconductor
Simple payment verification of a Bitcoin  transaction